Il Bello del Jazz is an album by jazz pianist Roberto Magris released on the Soul Note label in 2011, including performances by the Roberto Magris Europlane featuring saxophonist Herb Geller.

Reception

The AllMusic review by Scott Yanow awarded the album 4 stars and simply states: "The music is mostly straight-ahead jazz, mixing together medium-tempo romps with lyrical ballads. Magris and Geller are the main soloists, guitarist Darko Jurkovic guests on four numbers, and bassist Rudi Engel and drummer Gabriele Centis are excellent in support in the lead voices. Il Bello del Jazz is a set that grows in interest with each listen."

Track listing

 No Sadness (Roberto Magris) – 5:50
 Stray Form (Herb Geller) - 4:36
 Some Other Spring (Kitchings/Herzog) - 5:16
 Key Largo (Benny Carter) - 4:38
 A New Town Is a Blue Town (Adler/Ross) - 7:08
 Here I'll Stay (Weill/Lerner) - 5:33
 Ah Moore (Al Cohn) - 5:03
 Il Bello del Jazz (Roberto Magris) - 5:14
 Pretty Woman (Stephen Sondheim) - 6:04
 Parker's Pen (Roberto Magris) - 5:07
 Deception (Herb Geller) - 6:48

Personnel

Musicians
Herb Geller - alto sax
Darko Jurkovic - guitar (on # 1, 8, 10, 11)
Roberto Magris - piano
Rudi Engel - bass
Gabriele Centis - drums

Production
 Roberto Magris – producer
 Flavio Bonandrini – executive producer
 Fulvio Zafret – engineering
 Maria Bonandrini – design

References

2011 albums
Roberto Magris albums
Black Saint/Soul Note albums